General Arthur Joseph Marie Guyot d'Asnières de Salins (3 December 1857 - 11 August 1936) was a French military officer of the First World War, known as "the conqueror of Douaumont" in 1916, best known for being one of the founders of Scouting in France along with Jacques Sevin, the canon Cornette, Paul Coze and Édouard de Macedo. He was second Chief Scout of the Scouts de France (created in 1920) from 1922 to his death in 1936.

References

Scouting and Guiding in France
1857 births
1936 deaths
People from Auray